Roberta Vinci was the champion the last time the tournament was held in 2013, but she has since retired from professional tennis.

Jil Teichmann won the title, defeating Kiki Bertens in the final, 7–6(7–3), 6–2.

Seeds

Draw

Finals

Top half

Bottom half

Qualifying

Seeds

Qualifiers

Lucky losers

Draw

First qualifier

Second qualifier

Third qualifier

Fourth qualifier

Fifth qualifier

Sixth qualifier

References

Sources
Main Draw
 Qualifying Draw

Internazionali Femminili di Palermo - Singles
2019 Singles